Nota Schiller (born 1937) is an Orthodox Jewish rabbi and rosh yeshiva of Yeshivat Ohr Somayach, Jerusalem. He is an influential figure in the baal teshuva movement, having guided generations of students with little or no Jewish background to master the classical rabbinical texts and embrace an Orthodox lifestyle. He is widely regarded as an erudite Torah scholar in his own right.

Biography
Schiller was born in 1937 and raised in Brooklyn, New York, where he attended the high school division of Yeshiva Rabbi Chaim Berlin He graduated from Yeshivas Ner Yisroel in Baltimore.

The 1960s and 1970s were a time of searching for meaning by Western-educated, college-age men and women. In 1972, Rabbis Noah Weinberg, Mendel Weinbach, Nota Schiller, and Yaakov Rosenberg founded Shma Yisrael Yeshiva to teach young Jewish men with little or no background in Jewish studies. After a few years, Weinberg left the yeshiva over a difference in philosophy and founded Aish HaTorah in 1974, whereas Rav Rosenberg left and founded Machon Shlomo in Har Nof. Shma Yisrael subsequently changed its name to Ohr Somayach, after the commentary on the Mishneh Torah written by Rabbi Meir Simcha of Dvinsk, the Ohr Somayach, in response to critics who contended that the name belonged to the entire Jewish people, not just one institution.

Ohr Somayach International
Schiller was the driving force behind the development of Ohr Somayach International, which has opened yeshivas and learning branches in the United States, Canada, United Kingdom, South Africa, and Australia. He founded the first international Ohr Somayach program in Yonkers, New York in 1977. The program became an independent spin-off in 1979 and relocated to Monsey.

References

External links
Rabbi Nota Schiller audio lectures
"Multiples of Chai: One rabbi's war diary – Yom Kippur 5734/1973" by Rabbi Nota Schiller
"Four More Questions: Exploring the connection between the number 4 and Pesach" by Rabbi Nota Schiller

1937 births
Living people
20th-century rabbis in Jerusalem
21st-century rabbis in Jerusalem
Haredi rabbis in Israel
Rosh yeshivas
Rabbis of Ohr Somayach
Orthodox Jewish outreach
American emigrants to Israel
People from Brooklyn